Corpus Christi College Boat Club (Oxford) (CCCBC) is a rowing club for members of Corpus Christi College, Oxford. It is based on the Isis at Boathouse Island, Christ Church Meadow, Oxford, Oxford.

The club was founded in 1858 but has history dating back to 1833 when John Peard built Corpus their first four boat. Women joined the club in 1978.

See also
University rowing (UK)
Oxford University Boat Club
Rowing on the River Thames

References

Rowing clubs of the University of Oxford
Corpus Christi College, Oxford
Sports clubs established in 1858
Rowing clubs in Oxfordshire
Rowing clubs of the River Thames
Sport in Oxford
Rowing clubs in England